Northwestern Tasmanian, or Peerapper ("Pirapa"), is an aboriginal language of Tasmania in the reconstruction of Claire Bowern. It was spoken along the west coast of the island, from Macquarie Harbour north to Circular Head and Robbins Island.

Northwestern Tasmanian is poorly attested from four word lists: The "west coast" vocabularies of Charles Robinson and George Augustus Robinson, with 246 words combined; the Robbins Island list of George Augustus Robinson, with 162 words; and the Macquarie Harbour vocabularies of Allan Cunningham (222 words), collected in 1819.

The list collected by George Augustus Robinson at West Point ("Western Tribes") is divergent, and falls out as a separate language in Bowern. However, it includes only 28 words, so little can be definitively said.

References

Western Tasmanian languages
Languages extinct in the 19th century